Kasper Nielsen (born 9 June 1975) is a Danish team handball player. He is a two-times European Champion by winning both the 2008 and the 2012 European Men's Handball Championships with the Danish national handball team.

He participated at the 2008 Summer Olympics in Beijing, where the Danish team placed seventh, and the 2012 Summer Olympics in London where the team came sixth.

References

1975 births
Living people
Danish male handball players
Olympic handball players of Denmark
Handball players at the 2008 Summer Olympics
Handball players at the 2012 Summer Olympics
Handball-Bundesliga players
SG Flensburg-Handewitt players
People from Hillerød Municipality
Sportspeople from the Capital Region of Denmark